The Walton Primo X3 is an Android smartphone manufactured by Walton Group. It was introduced in July, 2014.

Features 

 Rear Camera: 13 MP
 Front Camera: 5 MP 
 Memory: 2 GB RAM
 Storage: 16 GB 
 Battery: Li-Po 2450 mAh
 Size: 5 In
 Dimensions: 145.1 X 70.2 X 5.5 mm
 Weight: 128.1 g
 Operating System: Android 4.4.2 KitKat
 CPU: Octacore 1.7 GHz Processor
 Sensors: Accelerometer, Gyroscope, G-sensor, Light, Proximity, Compass
 Weight: 145 g
 Super AMOLED capacitive touchscreen

References

Walton Primo X3

Android (operating system) devices
Mobile phones introduced in 2015